Narcissus nivalis is a species of the genus Narcissus (daffodils) in the family Amaryllidaceae. It is classified in Section Bulbocodium. It is native to Morocco in North Africa.

Taxonomy
Narcissus nivalis was described by the Spanish physician, naturalist and politician Mariano de la Paz Graells and published in Memorias, Real Academia de Ciencias Exactas, Físicas y Naturales de Madrid 2: 473, in 1859. The species name nivalis, means snow.

References

nivalis
Garden plants
Flora of North Africa
Plants described in 1859